Seda Babel or Echo of Babylon was published in Baghdad .It was owned by Chaldean Christians but was secular in outlook.

References

Publications established in 1909
Defunct newspapers published in Iraq
Arabic-language newspapers
Mass media in Baghdad